"A Lady Like You" is a song written by Keith Stegall and Jim Weatherly, and recorded by American country music artist Glen Campbell.  It was released in November 1984 as the second single from the album Letter to Home.  The song reached number 4 on the Billboard Hot Country Singles & Tracks chart.

Chart performance

References

1985 singles
Glen Campbell songs
Songs written by Keith Stegall
Songs written by Jim Weatherly
Song recordings produced by Harold Shedd
Atlantic Records singles
1984 songs